Realization is the art of creating music, typically an accompaniment, from a figured bass,  whether by improvisation in real time, or as a detained exercise in writing.  It is most commonly associated with Baroque music.

Competent performers of the era were expected to realize a stylistically appropriate accompaniment from a mere harmonic sketch, called a figured bass, and to do it at sight.  A system that allowed much flexibility, it became a lost art, but was revived in the 20th century by scholar-performers.

To realize a figured bass by writing down the actual notes to be played was (and is) a traditional exercise for students learning harmony and composition, and is used by music editors to make performing editions.

It was rare for established composers of the Baroque era to write down realizations.  With few exceptions, those that have survived are short teaching demonstrations, or else student exercises.  From this exiguous material must present-day scholars seek to recover the styles of the period, which varied considerably from time to time and place to place.

Concept

Composers of the Baroque era seldom wrote out the musical accompaniment (called the basso continuo, or simply continuo). Performers were expected to realize one to suit the occasion, guided by no more than a bare sketch called a figured bass (or thorough bass).

The figured bass consisted of a bass line written in normal staff notation, but marked with numerals or other symbols to indicate the harmonies.  A short example might look like this.

Indeed the entire Baroque period is sometimes referred to as the Figured Bass period.

A basso continuo is analogous to the rhythm section of present-day jazz and popular bands; the figured bass, to the lead sheets used by such bands.  However, realizing a figured bass has a challenging extra dimension.  It is not enough that the correct harmonies (regarded as vertically stacked notes) be played: the notes must succeed each other horizontally according to certain voice leading rules, which in the Baroque era were quite strict.

Ex. 1 is a short figured bass followed by one possible realization, by the composer Thomas Mace.

Execution
The realizer, while usually following the harmonic scheme indicated in the figuring, has a choice on such matters as rhythmic effect, chordal spacing, ornamentation, arpeggiation, imitation and counterpoint, limited only by sound judgement and good taste, and adherence to the genre's voice leading rules and stylistic conventions — ideally, those of the composer's time and place.  Ex. 2 shows four realizations of the same figured bass by the Baroque composer Francesco Geminiani.

In early Baroque the bass was usually unfigured.  However, by also considering the solo part the realizer could usually guess the harmonies ( Ex. 5).

Baroque era scores were riddled with copyist's or printer's errors, and sometimes an error of judgement by the composer himself.  Accordingly, the realizer had (and has) to be ready to spot these and correct them.  Thus, not only the figured harmonies, but even the explicit bass line can occasionally be altered. Said C.P.E. Bach:

Benefits
John Butt has argued that figured bass is an instance of "purposely incomplete" notation conferring a positive advantage. Accompaniments improvised from a figured bass line can be made to suit varying circumstances e.g. tempi, instrumentation, and even the hall acoustics.  Further, wrote Robert Donington: It was not from mere casualness that baroque composers preferred to trust their performers with figured bass ... It was from the high value they set on spontaneity. They believed, and modern experience confirms, that it is better to be accompanied with buoyancy than with polished workmanship. An accompanist who can give rhythmic impetus to his part, adapt it to the momentary requirements of balance and sonority, thicken it here and thin it there, and keep every bar alive, can stimulate his colleagues and help to carry the entire ensemble along. This is not merely to fill in the harmony; nor is it merely to make the harmony into an interesting part; it is to share in the creative urgency of the actual performance.

Drawbacks
Since few realizations were written down, except by pupils, not many have survived;  (A sonata movement by Bach — Ex. 4 — is believed to be a rare exception for this major composer.)  Where one has survived, it is precious evidence on the style of that particular time and place.  The notation "had this inherent defect — that no one who had not heard a composer play from his own figured bass parts could know the precise effects he produced or intended" or contemplated (for styles and performing conventions varied much, not only from country to country, but from time to time).  So when these realizing traditions were lost, a passage in figured bass was a dead letter, unless it could be somehow be revived by scholarship (see below).  Writing as late as 1959 Benjamin Britten said:

In actual performance

Baroque era
Keyboard accompaniments (e.g. harpsichord or organ) were meant to be spontaneously realized from the figured bass notation, the performer filling in the harmonic sketch as he went along.  J.S. Bach wrote:
Though keyboards have received most attention in the literature, there is abundant evidence the harmony was often realized by hand-plucked instruments e.g. lute, theorbo, guitar or harp (Exs. 1, 3, 5).  Further, it was played chordally on the same cello that supplied the bassline; or even on the solo violin itself — by double stopping (Ex. 7). Praetorius recommended a judicious selection of trombones, regals, flutes, violins, cornetts, recorders, "or a boy may sing the top line of all".

Early operas were produced from a score containing, mostly, just the vocal parts and figured bass (as in Ex. 6, without keyboard realization); these were elaborated and ornamented by the performers .  

The harmonic sketch in figured bass was only meant to be a suggestion, wrote Marc Pincherle, adding:   In Georg Philipp Telemann's understanding, "There are occasions when the accompanist may not wish to sound all the notes shown in the figuring. He is just as much within his rights in leaving out part of what is figured as he is in adding to what is figured."

Professionals
To realize a figured bass at sight was an expected accomplishment for any professional accompanist, an essential part of his musical training. In 1761 the nine-year old Muzio Clementi, to qualify for an organ post in Rome, passed a test where candidates were given a figured bass and told to perform an accompaniment, after which they were obliged to transpose it into various keys.  A top realizer had to be a master of composition, insisted Roger North (1710):
Altho a man may attain the art to strike the accords true to a thro-base [thorough bass] prescribed him according as it is figured, yet he may not pretend to be master of his part, without being a master of composition in general, for there is occasion of so much management in ye manner of play, sometimes striking only by accords, sometimes arpeggiando, sometimes touching ye air, and perpetually observing the emphatick places, to fill, forbear, or adorne, with a just favour, that a thro-base master, and not an ayerist, is but an abecedarian.

Even more demanding was partimento, in which composers were taught to improvise not just an accompaniment but a fully-fledged composition.

Amateurs
In the 18th century not just professionals were expected to accompany from a figured bass.  Music handbooks for amateurs proliferated, and most of these contained figured bass instructions. Handel wrote a course in realization for the daughters of George II. It taught, not only how to improvise accompaniments, but even fugues.  It is on sale today. 

Music publishing originated in 18th century Europe, and it did so to cater for a growing army of cultivated amateurs. "Everybody sang or played, and the experience of teaming up with others was enormous fun. Composers were more than happy to oblige by writing music that was within the grasp of these amateurs". The London publisher John Walsh — who sometimes passed off spurious pieces as and for the works of Corelli, Handel or Telemann — routinely issued his productions with figured basses. "Indeed, the chief consumers of the sonatas of Corelli and his imitators were not professional musicians but rather the gentlemen members of amateur music clubs. Walsh would have been able to count on a public of aristocratic and middle-class amateurs".

Some amateurs were outstanding, wrote Mary Cyr:One such woman was the unusually gifted Princess Anne, Handel's lifelong friend, whose continuo realizations impressed.

For fashionable young ladies who only wanted to acquire the art as a social skill, there were tutors that taught a quick pragmatic way to play a continuo — of sorts.  Although not considered very elegant, a player could usually manage by arpeggiation, (illustrated in Ex. 9).  The ability of some amateurs to play from figured bass, and even direct an orchestra from the keyboard, persisted into the early Classical period. In the United States, familiarity persisted farther.  Not only could amateurs be found who could play from figured bass, but briskly selling tune books — of popular music — were routinely published with figured bass parts, until the middle of the 19th century.

Disuse
After the Baroque era the art died out.  By the time of the popular revival of J.S. Bach's music (by Mendelssohn, 1829) the performing traditions had been forgotten; musicians took no account of Bach's figured basses; they played him without a continuo realization — sometimes with grotesque results.  Here and there a Brahms could be found who was adept at continuo improvisation but the ordinary competent musician demanded a realized score.

In 1949 William J. Mitchell wrote: "The extemporaneous realization of a figured bass is a dead art. We have left behind us the period of the basso continuo and with it all the unwritten law, the axioms, the things that were taken for granted; in a word, the spirit of the time". That year American harpsichordist and musicologist Putnam Aldrich tried to revive the practice at a Pierre Monteux rehearsal of "absolutely authentic" Bach:

But a revival of the art of live realization was underway.

Modern revival
Already in 1935 the highly successful recordings of the Brandenburg Concertos by the Busch Chamber Players had a continuo realization. Their 1948 Kingsway Hall concerts were the highlights of the London season; audiences, reported Adolf Aber, felt here, at last, was the music of Bach and Handel as it was meant to be performed.
even though it had no pretence to be historically informed — just plain, unobtrusive chords on a grand piano sounded by Rudolf Serkin which may or may not have been written down in advance.

Interest in improvising historically informed realizations of figured bass was first revived by amateurs in England.  The early music pioneer Arnold Dolmetsch's The Interpretation of the Music of the XVIIth and XVIIIth Centuries (1915) had a chapter on realizing figured bass, richly illustrated with historical examples. Dolmetsch advocated spontaneity before academic pedantry. Thus, a "noble" specimen by Michael Praetorius was "just right for effect; but it would not get a high number of points in a musical examination".  

In 1931 Franck Thomas Arnold, who like Dolmetsch was a self-taught scholar, published his pioneeringThe Art of Accompaniment from a Thorough-bass: As Practised in the XVIIth & XVIIIth Centuries.  Wrote Arnold: Highly acclaimed by scholars and critics — Ernest Newman said it was "the finest piece of musicography ever produced" in England — Arnold's book was studied by a new breed of historically informed scholar-performers, including American Ralph Kirkpatrick and Janny van Wering and Ton Koopman in the Netherlands.  Other works were Thurston Dart, The interpretation of music (London, 1954); Robert Donington, The interpretation of early music (London, 1963); and Peter Williams, Figured Bass Accompaniment (Edinburgh, 1970), of which a reviewer wrote, "So far as any sense can be made of a subject the essence of which is that it be not written down, Dr Williams has done it".

By the end of the 20th century the scene had been transformed.  Wrote American harpsichordist and editor Doris Ornstein: "[Thurston] Dart lived long enough to see his book, teaching, and personal example create a whole new breed of scholar-performers who can create stylish realizations. (In England, continuo playing is practically a cottage industry!)" . Already by the late 1960s the lost art had been recovered by a number of harpsichord players, of which Gustav Leonhardt was the most prominent. Under his direction the Conservatorium van Amsterdam abolished the written paper requiring the realization of a figured bass line, in favour of a practical one.  By 2013 the Conservatorium was offering a degree course in Basso Continuo Specialization, the first institute in the world to do so; a Master's degree was available.

It was objected, however, that practitioners had evolved a 'generic' basso continuo style characteristic of the late-20th century. Described by Lars Ulrik Mortensen as modest, discreet and unobtrusive, it was not what Baroque practitioners necessarily did. Some would have played a "full-voiced" (thicker) style, for example (Exs. 8, 11) or an embellished style (Ex. 10). No real Baroque-era musician could have managed the diversity of styles and idioms that flourished in different lands and at different times in the period, concerning which specific knowledge is patchy. These required a new generation of specialist scholar-performers.

In writing

As a detained exercise in writing, figured bass has been realized when performers could not improvise, or as a teaching exercise, or when music publishers wanted to supply a pre-realised product.

Towards the end of the Baroque era, wrote Ernio Stipčević 

Bach's BWV 1079 was composed at the end of the Baroque era.  Though it has a figured bass, its harmonies are demanding.  Ex. 12 contains a written out realization by Bach's former pupil Johann Kirnberger.

Music publishing

Figured basses are realized by editors of performing editions when performers cannot or do not wish to do it by themselves.

The early music revival in mid 19th century Germany, which by now had the most sophisticated music publishing industry in the world, created a demand for editions with pre-realized continuos since most performers did not know how to realize figured bass any more.  As to that, two philosophical schools were bitter rivals, and nowhere did they clash more fiercely than on how to realize figured bass.

The 'Romantic' school venerated the past, revering it for its own sake.  Adherents included Friedrich Chrysander, Philipp Spitta, and Heinrich Bellermann.  Their most impressive achievement was the Bach-Gesellschaft complete edition of J.S. Bach's works, "based on the original sources and with no changes, cuts, or additions" — hence, with figured basses, but no realizations.  They were jeered by the rival school for being mere musicologists with no artistic creativity.  To refute this, in 1870 Chrysander published an edition of Handel songs in which the figured basses were realized by indisputably talented musicians, including Johannes Brahms — one of their supporters.

The contending 'Hegelian' school believed that deep historical laws ensured that art manifested itself in increasingly perfect forms, and so early music ought to be modernised for present-day audiences. They sincerely believed they owed it to the music, since they were only doing what Bach, Handel, and so forth, would have done themselves, had they been alive to do it.  Members of this school included Robert Franz, Selmar Bagge and Julius Schaeffer.  The Handel songs edition attracted their scorn.  Franz penned a highly critical open letter in which, amongst other things, he caught out Brahms in the sin of writing a number of parallel fifths and octaves ("Handel's style allows for no schoolboy mistakes", he mocked) — which touched Brahms on a raw nerve. In 1882 Franz himself brought out an edition of some of the same Handel songs.  Unlike Brahms, Franz's realizations were florid and obtrusive (Exs. 13a vs. 13b).

This dichotomy meant that, for generations after its revival, either Bach's music was published without any realizations, — often being performed with no continuo at all, therefore — or else with historically inauthentic realizations, criticised for being "purely fantastic", "strangely unreal", "ruthlessly corrupted", "heavy, pianistic, and with a strangely nineteenth-century flavour",  just "a few dull chords", or as conceited, pushy, usurping the composer's function.

Modern editorial realizations, when they are provided at all, depend for their success on sound judgement and careful scholarship.  There may be a dilemma. Said one modern editor: "A good realization depends on scholarship, imagination, sympathy with the soloist, familiarity with every nuance of the text, and consideration of the varying circumstances of performance"; and, for her eidition, she went to the extent of imagining a specific performance with a particular singer and the sonorities of a particular harpsichord, which, logically, could have implied a single performance and a single sale.  Already this dilemma had been faced by Brahms, who believed that "[ideally] each individual realization should be made with a view to a particular performance, taking into account specific forces, instruments, and location.

Teaching and exams

J.S. Bach's pupils were routinely given a single melody line with a figured bass and told to realize a four-part chorale.  Or he made them realise figured basses by Italian composers (Ex. 14). Only when they had mastered these exercises were they allowed to compose their own bass lines and harmonies.

Such pedagogical methods were commonplace in the 18th century. Thomas Attwood, while Mozart's pupil, was made to realize figured basses.  Once Attwood had acquired confidence, Mozart challenged him with a very chromatic figured bass — it swiftly progressed from the key of C to C#.  (Back in England, these papers were passed on reverently from master to favourite pupil for several generations.)

However, after the Baroque era — when basso continuo was employed no longer — the original purpose was lost sight of, since these educational methods had acquired a momentum of their own, carried on anyway by sheer inertia.  Realization of figured bass became a puzzle-solving skill in its own right, bearing no relation to practical musicianship.  Realizing a figured bass was a routine exam question; marks were impartially deducted for academic faults regardless of their artistic significance, if any.

George Bernard Shaw recalled having to do those exercises:

By 1932 R.O. Morris could say "Figured Bass as a means of teaching harmony is now universally discredited."

See also
Partimento

References and notes

Sources

 

.

 

Accompaniment
Baroque music
Historically informed performance
Music education
Music history
Musical improvisation